Jean Dumont may refer to:

 Jean Dumont (publicist) (1667–1727), French writer and historian
 Jean Dumont (wrestler) (1886–?), Belgian Greco-Roman wrestler
 Jean Dumont (historian) (1923–2001), French historian and publisher
 Jean Dumont (politician) (1930–2021), French politician
 Jean Dumont (cyclist) (born 1943), French road bicycle racer